Valentin Nikolayevich Parmon (born 18 April 1948 in Brandenburg) is a Russian scientist who is credited with inventing new and improved catalytic processes in the field of energy technology.

Career 

Parmon graduated from the Moscow Institute of Physics and Technology in 1972 and received a postgraduate physical and mathematical sciences degree from the same institution in 1975. He went on to work as a researcher, first at the Semenov Institute of Chemical Physics in Moscow, and then from 1977, at the Boreskov Institute of Catalysis in Novosibirsk. From 1995 to 2015, he served as the director of the institute, and he is currently (2016) its scientific advisor.

Parmon received a chemistry doctorate in 1985 and was appointed professor in 1989. He has been a full member of the Russian Academy of Sciences since 1997.

His research interests have included chemical kinetics, photocatalysis, catalytic conversion of fossil fuels, chemical storage of renewable energy and conversion of biomass into fuel. In particular, he led the development of commercially successful new catalytic processes for producing fuel compliant with the Euro 4 and Euro 5 standards and the creation of an experimental system for chemically storing solar energy at an efficiency of 43 percent. The institute that he headed has also developed catalytic processes for combustion of low-quality fuels. These have been commercially applied to coal-fired boilers and may potentially be used for producing energy from wastewater treatment sludge.

In 2009, Parmon was awarded the State Prize of the Russian Federation in science and technology, and in 2016, the Global Energy Prize for the development of new catalysts for petroleum refining and renewable energy.

References 

Moscow Institute of Physics and Technology alumni
1948 births
Russian chemists
People from Brandenburg an der Havel
State Prize of the Russian Federation laureates
Living people
Full Members of the Russian Academy of Sciences
Scientists from Novosibirsk